The men's individual road race at the 1948 Summer Olympics was held on an 11.45 km course. The course was circled seventeen times, so the total length of the competition was 194.6 km. There were 141 entries from 31 nations and 101 participants from 29 nations. Of the 101 starters, 28 rode the distance to the end. The event was won by José Beyaert of France, the nation's second consecutive victory in the men's individual road race. The Netherlands and Belgium won their first medals in the event, with Gerrit Voorting's silver and Lode Wouters's bronze, respectively.

Each nation could enter up to four cyclists. A team classification was made, based on the rankings of the three best cyclists per nation, and this was used to determine the results of the team road race.

Background

This was the third appearance of the event, previously held in 1896 and 1936; it would be held at every Summer Olympics after 1936. It replaced the individual time trial event that had been held from 1912 to 1932 (and which would be reintroduced alongside the road race in 1996). There was no clear favorite, though Adolfo Ferrari of Italy was the reigning world champion. The race was initially intended to be held at Richmond Park in Surrey, but "a law was discovered that prohibited any activity there at more than 20 miles per hour."

Argentina, Guyana, India, Mexico, Norway, Pakistan, South Korea, and Uruguay each made their debut in the men's individual road race. Great Britain made its third appearance in the event, the only nation to have competed in each appearance to date.

Competition format and course

The mass-start race was on a course that covered 17 laps of a 11.45 kilometres circuit around Windsor Great Park, for a total of 194.63 kilometres. The course was "relatively flat." It "included no severe gradients, but was sufficiently undulating to provide a real test of stamina, and with bends . . . which needed all the skill of the contestants at the speed at which the race was run." The surface was less than ideal, with "loose gravel roads" causing numerous punctures.

Schedule

All times are British Summer Time (UTC+1)

Results

Johansson broke away from the pack during the second lap, with Voorting and Faanhof catching him in lap 3. Johansson suffered a puncture during lap 9, falling back to the peloton. A chase group of nine cyclists caught up to Voorting and Faanhof on lap 12, but crashes and punctures dropped Faanhof, Rasmussen, and Rouffeteau out of the lead pack. Thomas was the first to attempt a breakaway, on lap 16, but was quickly caught by De Lathouwer and less-quickly caught by the rest of the pack in the last lap. Beyaert made two pushes on the last lap, being caught by the pack on the first but separating from the group on a short climb a half-mile away from the finish line; he held on to win the race. Voorting finished with a sprint for the silver medal.

References

Road cycling at the 1948 Summer Olympics
Cycling at the Summer Olympics – Men's road race